The 1928–29 Clarkson Golden Knights men's ice hockey season was the 9th season of play for the program. The team was coached by Gordon Croskery in his 6th season.

Season
Clarkson entered its ninth season having already established itself as one of the top programs in the East. Despite the departure of its two defensive stalwarts, The Golden Knights were looking to try and finish the year undefeated, having missed that mark by just one game in back-to-back campaigns. From the start of the season, the team looked like they had a chance to do just that when they easily won a game over visiting Victoria College. The game saw the debut of three new players, with 'Ike' Houston leading the team in scoring. The match also saw the appearance of an 8-foot wooden fence around the Ives Park rink. The palisade was put in place so that spectators would have to pay an entry fee to watch the game.

The performance in the second game was just as dominating for Tech as the team brushed Vermont aside 9–0. The only thing that marred the game was a snow flurry that caused the final period to be cut down to 15 minutes. For their third game of the season, Clarkson travelled to Canton and met St. Lawrence without the services of three players. Donald, Houston and Williams were unable to participate because they were freshmen (Clarkson and St. Lawrence belonged to the same athletic conference which did not allow freshmen to play on varsity teams) and the shorthanded Knights had a fight on their hands as a result. The missing offensive punch caused Tech to be held back by the Larries' defense early, enabling the home team to score first. All-American captain Fred Dion scored twice before the end of the first but the offense continued to fall short afterwards. St. Lawrence tied the game in the second and the already-bitter rivals held one another scoreless for most of the third. Near the end of the game, Johnny Burke slipped through the defense and netted the game-winner, keeping Clarkson's record spotless.

Next, Clarkson went south to New Jersey to take on Princeton in a rematch of last year's 8–5 classic. With the ice in rough shape, the Tigers weren't about to take Tech lightly and put forth a stout performance. Princeton held the Clarkson offense at bay and built a 3–0 lead by the early part of the second period. Tech finally got their shots to go in afterwards, cutting the lead to just 1 by the start of the third, but the Tigers closed out the game strong and won 3–5. The Knights didn't have much time to lick their wounds as they returned home and faced an equally stiff challenge from Queen's. Leading up to the game the weather seemed to be accommodating, remaining cold and dry most of the week. Unfortunately, on game day the thermostat rose and sleet showered the ice, turning the match into a slog. To top it off, near-gale-force winds swept the rink during the game and hampered both teams abilities and opportunities. While Clarkson eked out a 1–0 victory, calls for an enclosed rink were renewed as a team befitting Clarkson's talent shouldn't have to put up with such circumstances.

For their first game in February, Clarkson met another member of college hockey's elite in Dartmouth. The Indians were in the midst of a very strong season, holding a record of 6–2–2 and having lost only to the nation's best squad (Yale). The Knights weren't favored in the match and were only given a fighting chance in the contest. It must have come as a shock to the blue-bloods when Tech manhandled the Green throughout the game, which was place before a packed house at Ives Park. With clean ice for the first time in recent memory, Clarkson out-skated, out-shot and out-hit their opponents. More so than any game in program history, the Knights victory over Dartmouth announced that they were a force to be reckoned with.

The momentum was carried over into the next three games and Clarkson rolled over its collegiate competition by a combined score of 24–4. In Late February the team concluded its season against the Nichols Club of Buffalo. The game was loose defensively and Clarkson allowed 6 goals to Nichols, however, they were also able to fire six shots into the net. For the overtime, the two teams had agreed to play two 5-minute periods and Clarkson was dominant in both, scoring three times while the play became increasingly physical. While the team's historical records includes a further game, contemporary accounts have Nichols being the final match. After the year, Fred Dion, who had switched from center to defense at the start of the season, was named to the (unofficial) All-American squad for a second straight year.

Roster

Standings

Schedule and results

|-
!colspan=12 style=";" | Regular Season

Note: The dates for some games differ from what is listed in Clarkson's historical record. Additionally, two games are listed by Clarkson's records but do not appear to have been played.

References

Clarkson Golden Knights men's ice hockey seasons
Clarkson
Clarkson
Clarkson
Clarkson